This is a list of the 29 molecules of chlorinated propane in order of number of chlorine atoms.

Monochloro 

 1-Chloropropane
 2-Chloropropane

Dichloro 

 1,1-Dichloropropane
 1,2-Dichloropropane
 1,3-Dichloropropane
 2,2-Dichloropropane

Trichloro 

 1,1,1-Trichloropropane
 1,2,3-Trichloropropane
 1,2,2-Trichloropropane
 1,1,2-Trichloropropane
 1,1,3-Trichloropropane

Tetrachloro 

 1,1,1,2-Tetrachloropropane
 1,1,1,3-Tetrachloropropane
 1,1,2,2-Tetrachloropropane
 1,1,2,3-Tetrachloropropane
 1,1,3,3-Tetrachloropropane
 1,2,2,3-tetrachloropropane

Pentachloro 

 1,1,1,2,2-Pentachloropropane
 1,1,1,2,3-Pentachloropropane
 1,1,1,3,3-Pentachloropropane
 1,1,2,2,3-Pentachloropropane
 1,1,2,3,3-Pentachloropropane

Hexachloro 

 1,1,1,2,2,3-Hexachloropropane
 1,1,1,2,3,3-Hexachloropropane
 1,1,1,3,3,3-Hexachloropropane
 1,1,2,2,3,3-Hexachloropropane

Heptachloro 

 1,1,1,2,2,3,3-Heptachloropropane
 1,1,1,2,3,3,3-Heptachloropropane

Octachloro 

 Octachloropropane

References 

Chlorinated propanes
Chloroalkanes